Rhodoleia is a genus of plants in the family Hamamelidaceae. Together with its sister genus Exbucklandia,  Rhodoleia forms the sister clade to the other 25 genera of Hamamelidaceae. Flowers of Rhodoleia are bird-pollinated. Nectar-foraging birds including Japanese white-eyes (Zosterops japonicus, Zosteropidae) and fork-tailed sunbirds (Aethopyga christinae, Nectariniidae), avidly visit the flowers, which they also pollinate in the process.

Species include:

Rhodoleia championii
Rhodoleia henryi
Rhodoleia macrocarpa
Rhodoleia stenopetala

References

External links
Flora of China

Hamamelidaceae
Saxifragales genera
Taxonomy articles created by Polbot